Albanohyus was an extinct genus of even-toed ungulates which lived during the Miocene in Eurasia and possibly Africa.

It is considered an earlier and more primitive relative of Cainochoerus.

References

Miocene even-toed ungulates
Fossil taxa described in 1974
Prehistoric even-toed ungulate genera
Miocene mammals of Asia
Miocene mammals of Europe
Miocene mammals of Africa
Prehistoric Suidae